The San Francisco Human Rights Commission (HRC) is a charter commission of the City and County of San Francisco that works to increase equality, eradicate discrimination, and to protect human rights for all people.  The HRC enforces City Ordinances and policies on nondiscrimination and promotes social and economic progress for all.

History 
In 1963, the modern day civil rights movement manifested in San Francisco through demonstrations against hotels, supermarkets, drive-in restaurants, automobile showrooms and automobile repair shops which were discriminating against African Americans.  In early 1964, Mayor John Shelley appointed an Interim Committee on Human Relations, which subsequently recommended to the Board of Supervisors that a permanent Human Rights Commission be established.  In July 1964, the Board of Supervisors passed the recommendation, and Mayor Shelley signed an ordinance establishing the Human Rights Commission.

From 1964, the Human Rights Commission grew in response to City government's mandate to address the causes of and problems resulting from prejudice, intolerance, bigotry and discrimination. The Mayor and the Board of Supervisors gave the Human Rights Commission more and broader powers and duties to address these problems, and passed additional ordinances, which were implemented by the Human Rights Commission.  In June 1990, the voters of San Francisco established the Human Rights Commission as a Charter Commission (see Section 3.699-5 of the Charter).

General information 
The San Francisco Human Rights Commission (HRC) is a department of the City and County of San Francisco [and County of San Francisco] that works to increase equality, eradicate discrimination, and to protect human rights for all people. The HRC enforces City Ordinances and policies on nondiscrimination and promotes social and economic progress for all. Some of the HRC's core focuses include:

Discrimination Complaints: Studying, investigating, and mediating incidents of discrimination, including intergroup tensions.
Equal Benefits: Working to increase equality for employees in Domestic Partnerships and prevent discrimination in City contracting.
Local Business Enterprise: Promoting the utilization of local businesses in City contracting, helping build small businesses in the City's underserved and marginalized neighborhoods. 
LGBT: Advocating for and assisting the lesbian, gay, bisexual, and transgender communities with issues of discrimination.
Equity Advisory Committee: Advises the Commission on quality of life issues such as homelessness, environmental justice, immigration, healthcare, and other matters affecting people's lives in San Francisco.

The HRC also works in other human rights issues, such as combating human trafficking, hate crimes, and bullying. For more information, please visit the HRC website.

About the Human Rights Commission's advisory committees 
Advisory committees are an integral and vitally important component of the HRC, providing for community involvement and opportunity for in-depth study and exploration of issues.  The Chair of the Commission assigns Commissioners and appoints members from the community to participate in these committees.  The HRC currently maintains three advisory committees: the Equity Advisory Committee; the Local Business Enterprise Committee and the Lesbian Gay Bisexual & Transgender Advisory Committee. The Executive Director is Theresa Sparks.

Current initiatives 
HRC staff are currently working on a range of human rights policy issues all of which can be found on the HRC's website.  A snapshot of these issues include:

Creation of a Youth Anti-Bullying Training Module: The HRC is working with Assemblyperson Tom Ammiano's Office to replicate his anti-bullying legislation (also known as Seth’s Law), in order to create a youth sensitivity training module for City Departments, Agents and Contractors working with youth.
Hate Crimes Prevention: The HRC staffs the Coalition Against Hate Violence, which is composed of various nongovernmental and government agencies, who work together to prevent hate violence and to protect individuals who have been subjected to hate violence.
Combating Human Trafficking in San Francisco: The HRC staffs the San Francisco Collaborative Against Human Trafficking (SFCAHT), which is composed of over 25 agencies, all of which are committed to ending human trafficking in San Francisco.  SFCAHT's goals consists of: increasing the general public's awareness about human trafficking; broadening the scope of current outreach efforts to inform survivors of human trafficking of the resources and services available to them; and to collect data about human trafficking in San Francisco in order to build the base of information about the true scope and impact of human trafficking citywide.
Sanctuary City Ordinance Enforcement: According to the Sanctuary City Ordinance, City Departments, Commissions or City employees may not help Immigration and Customs Enforcement with immigration investigations or arrests unless such help is required by federal or state law or a warrant.  The HRC enforces the Sanctuary City Ordinance and HRC staff assist the public with filing, mediating, and investigating complaints of non-compliance of the SCO.
Comprehensive Health Care for the Transgender Community: The HRC is working with Assemblyperson Tom Ammiano, the State Department of Managed Health Care and the Transgender Law Center to extend comprehensive healthcare benefits to the transgender community.

Reports and publications

Commission 
Community Concerns of Surveillance, Racial and Religious Profiling of Arab, Middle Eastern, Muslim, and South Asian Communities and Potential Reactivation of SFPD Intelligence Gathering (February 2011)
Discrimination by Omission: Issues of Concern for Native Americans in San Francisco (August 2007)
Racial Privacy Initiative (2006)
Violence In Our City: Research and Recommendations to Empower Our Community (December 2001)
Compliance Guidelines To Prohibit Weight and Height Discrimination (July 2001)

Lesbian Gay Bisexual Transgender Advisory Committee Reports/Hearings 
Beyond Marriage: Unrecognized Family Relationships (March 2011)
Bisexual Invisibility: Impacts and Recommendations (March 2011)
A Human Rights Investigation Into the "Normalization" of Intersex People (April 2005)
Aging in the Lesbian Gay Bisexual Transgender Communities (April 2003)
Economic Empowerment for the Lesbian Gay Bisexual Transgender Communities (November 2000)
Investigation into the Needs of Lesbian, Gay, Bisexual, Transgender, Queer, and Questiong Youth (1997)
Investigation into Discrimination Against Transgendered People (September 1994)

External links
Official site

Organizations based in San Francisco
Government of San Francisco
Human rights organizations based in the United States